Robert Berridge (born 22 November 1984) is a retired New Zealand professional light heavyweight boxer.

Berridge is a boxer who has had over thirty fights, five boxing titles and has peaked at ninth on the World Boxing Organization and twelfth on the World Boxing Association rankings in 2014. In 2009, Berridge made his debut against Royden Lee at ABA Stadium. In 2015 in South Africa, Berridge had his first World title bout against Thomas Oosthuizen for the International Boxing Organization Light Heavyweight title. Berridge lost by unanimous decision. Berridge second World title shot was for the Interim WBA World Light Heavyweight Title against Dmitry Bivol. Berridge lost by TKO.

Professional career

Pre Duco, First boxing titles 2009–2013
Berridge suffered his first lost against Blake Caparello by unanimous decision. Berridge took the fight with very short notice. A rematch has always been talked about with Caparello, but nothing has ever came from it. The NZPBAssn presented Berridge with the Association's New Zealand Light Heavyweight title. His manager/promoter Vasco Kovacevic tried six boxers of standing to match Robbie for the title. All declined for various reasons.  Robbie made a token appearance in the ring in a 4 x 3 bout against Moses Ioelu. Moses was the only one who volunteered to get in the ring, but with only 4 x 3's.  Robbie was presented the belt after the bout. Berridge got the biggest win of his career after he defeated world ranked Australian Boxer Serge Yannick. Berridge won by TKO in the 8th round. Berridge won his first regional title against Shintaro Matsumoto in July 2013 at ABA Stadium for the WBC Asian Boxing Council Light Heavyweight title. Berridge won by TKO in the fifth round.

Under Duco Boxing 2013–2014
Berridge won his next two boxing title against New Zealander Daniel MacKinnon for the vacant WBA Pan Asian Boxing Association title and vacant WBO Oriental title. Berridge won TKO in the tenth round. MacKinnon was rushed to hospital after the fight. After a CT scan it was discovered that MacKinnon had a brain bleed and had emergency surgery. MacKinnon was in a coma however woke up less than 24 hours after the surgery. MacKinnon made a fully recover however his boxing career is over. Berridge suffered his second lose to Lepikhin in his first fight in America, losing both of his regional titles. Lepikhin is five and half inches taller and had a four-inch reach advantage. Berridge lost by TKO in the fifth round. While under Duco he reached 22nd on Boxrec, 10th in WBO, 12th in WBA and including being his 4 wins on Duco Event fight nights, he had a 9 win streak, including wins over Mariano Jose Riva, Daniel MacKinnon, Kerry Foley, Rogerio Damasco and more.

Post Duco, IBO World title, Tournament, NZ title defense 2015–2016
Berridge went for his first world title in June 2015 against IBO Champion Thomas Oosthuizen in South Africa. Berridge also took this fight at short notice. Controversy came around this bout as Oosthuizen did not make weight. When given the opportunity came to give Oosthuizen two hours to shed off the excess weight, he came weighing even more than the first weigh in. There has been reports that promoters try to convince Berridge's team to postpone the bout, however the bout went on. The World Title was declared vacant with the stipulation added that if Oosthuizen won the title will remain vacant, however if Berridge won he would be the new World Champion. Also thirty percent of Oosthuizen's purse was forfeited to Berridge. Berridge unfortunately suffered his third lose of his career by Unanimous Decisionand the title remain vacant. In November 2015 Berridge competed in the Super Eight Boxing Tournament. Usually the Super 8 is a one night eight man tournament, However the Super 8 rebranded into 2 four man tournaments in one night. The other men in the tournament are Christchurch's Reece Papuni & Brad Riddell and Auckland's Sefo Falekaono. Both Berridge and Papuni won their first fights, with both bouts going the extra round due to original score ending in a draw. Berridge fought Sefo Falekaono in the first round in the tournament. Berridge took on Papuni in the finals with the bout again going into the 4th round due to original score ending in a draw. The bout ended with Papuni winning the bout by Unanimous decision. In July 2016, Sam Rapira Announced that he will be self-promoting his 8th show with Rapira taking on Berridge in the main event. This is one of New Zealand's most talked about dream fight in the light heavyweight weight division. The bout took place at TSB Stadium in September 2016. Berridge won the bout by unanimous decision. After the bout Berridge commented on how poor referee David Craig (who is also President of New Zealand Professional Boxing Federation) officiated the fight, with the lack of control and not stepping in when there was too much holding or wrestling. In October 2016, Berridge took on long time rival Adrian Taihia, defending Berridges New Zealand (NZPBA version) Light Heavyweight title for the second time. This bout has been five years in the making where the two call each other out multiple times, including a WWE like style from Taihia when Berridge finished fighting in a bout on PPV. The two were scheduled to face each other in 2013, however Berridge pulled out due to injury. During the weigh in, the two had a war of words in which resulted in push from Taihia, push Berridge into a couple of tables and breaking the contents on the tables. Berridge won the bout by unanimous decision. Taihia was showing a Floyd Mayweather like boxing style, but it was Taihia low punch output and Berridge aggression that won Berridge the bout. Shortly after the fight Taihia announced his retirement from the ring, stating that he felt he was robbed from the fight and that he lost his passion in the sport.

World Title Shots and Retirement 2017
In January 2017, Berridge announced on his Facebook page that he will be taking on Russia's Dmitry Bivol for the Interim WBA World Light Heavyweight Title. Berridge lost the bout in the 4th round by TKO, stopped by the ringside doctor due to a major cut. In May 2017, Berridge took on Canadian Ryan Ford for the Universal Boxing Organisation World Light Heavyweight title. Due to a head clash in round 6, it caused a bad cut to Berridge which happens regularly for Berridge. The bout stopped in round 7 due to the cut being bad, with Ford winning on points by Technical Decision. A week after the fight, Berridge announced on his Facebook that he is retiring from professional boxing.

Comeback 2018
In April 2018, Berridge announce he will be making a comeback in the Cruiserweight division. However, due to a broken hand during training he was not able to compete and the injury required surgery. On 14 December 2018, Berridge made his return into the ring at ABA Stadium against Bordin Peepueh, but staying in the light heavyweight division. Peepueh continuously stayed on the back foot as Berridge hunted down his opponent in the ring. Berridge knocked his opponent down twice before the referee waived it off in the first round.

Controversy
In December 2014 Berridge became highly intoxicated at a Duco Events Fight for Life in Hamilton, New Zealand. Due to his training regime he did not usually drink and became highly intoxicated as a result. On the way back home Berridge jumped out of the car that his manager was driving on the way back to his home to Auckland with Berridge and his wife. The car was going 100 km/hr. When Berridge's wife tried to get him back in the car, Berridge lashed out arms flailing. The manager and Berridge's wife decided to leave him there while Berridge himself tried to walk and hitchhike home the next morning. Once Berridge got home he immediately searched up the government anti-violence It's Not Ok! website and enrolled himself into a family violence course. Shortly after this had happen Duco Event's released Berridge out of there stable and his contract. Berridge was signed to a six-year contract with Duco but only fought three times under the contract which may have led to his increasing frustration under Duco and not being on the Fight for Life. Since the incident Berridge has been highly apologetic to the people he disappointed with his behaviour.

In May 2016, Berridge had pulled out of a fight on Joseph Parker vs Carlos Takam undercard due to neck injury. Berridge was scheduled to fight Joseph Kwadjo, however Berridge was replaced by Nikolas Charalampous. Berridge Stated that the fight was hard to come about as Duco Events (the promoter of the event) were refusing to pay Berridge, making him and his team having to pay the purse for both him and his opponent and other benefits such as flights and accommodation. After Berridge pulled out, Duco found and paid for an opponent (Nikolas Charalampous) without reimbursing Berridge.

Professional boxing titles
New Zealand Professional Boxing Association
New Zealand National Light Heavyweight title (174½ Ibs)
World Boxing Council
WBC Asian Boxing Council Light Heavyweight Title (173¾ Ibs)
World Boxing Association
Pan Asian Boxing Association Light Heavyweight Title (173½ Ibs)
World Boxing Organization
WBO Oriental Light Heavyweight Title (173½ Ibs)
International Boxing Organization
IBO Oceania Light Heavyweight Title (174¼ Ibs)

Professional boxing record

References

External links

|-

|-

|-

|-

1984 births
Living people
Sportspeople from Whanganui
New Zealand male boxers
Light-heavyweight boxers
New Zealand professional boxing champions
Boxers from Auckland